The Tehrani accent, or Tehrani dialect, is a dialect of Persian spoken in Tehran and the most common colloquial variant of the Western Persian. Compared to literary standard Persian, the Tehrani dialect lacks original Persian diphthongs and tends to fuse certain sounds. The Tehrani accent should not be confused with the Old Tehrani dialect, which was a Northwestern Iranian dialect, belonging to the central group.

Some of the words used in the Tehrani accent may derive from the northwestern Iranian language of Razi, such as sūsk "beetle; cockroach", jīrjīrak "cricket", zālzālak "haw(thorn)", and vejīn "weeding".

Differences between Standard Persian and Tehrani dialect

The following are some of the main differences between colloquial Tehrani Persian and standard Iranian Persian:

Simplification of some internal consonant clusters: 
Standard Persian /zd/ ↔ Tehrani /zː/. Example: دزدى /dozdi/ ↔ /dozːi/
Standard Persian /st/ ↔ Tehrani /sː/. Examples: دسته /dæste/ ↔ /dæsːe/; پسته /peste/ ↔ /pesːe/
A number of vowel raising processes and diphthong loss: 
Standard Persian /ɒːn, ɒːm/ ↔ Tehrani /uːn, uːm/. Example: بادام /bɒːdɒːm/ ↔ /bɒːduːm/
Standard Persian /e/ ↔ Tehrani [i]. Examples: جگر /dʒegær/ ↔ [dʒigær]; شکار /ʃekɒːr/ ↔ [ʃikɒːr]; کشمش /keʃmeʃ/ ↔ [kiʃmiʃ]
The word-final // in Classical Persian became [] in modern Tehrani Persian, both colloquial and standard dialects (often romanized as "eh", meaning [] is also an allophone of // in word-final position in modern Tehrani Persian) except for نه [] ('no'), but is preserved in the Dari dialects.
Standard Persian /ou̯/ ↔ Tehrani [oː]. Examples: برو /borou̯/ ↔ [boroː]; نوروز /nou̯ruːz/ ↔ [noːruːz]
 غ and ق denoted the original Arabic phonemes in Classical Persian, the voiced velar fricative  and the voiceless uvular stop  (pronounced in Persian as voiced uvular stop ), respectively. In modern Tehrani Persian (which is used in the Iranian mass media, both colloquial and standard), there is no difference in the pronunciation of غ and ق. Both letters are pronounced as a voiced velar fricative  when positioned intervocalically and unstressed, and as a voiced uvular stop  otherwise. This allophony is probably influenced by Turkic languages like Azeri and Turkmen. The classic pronunciations of غ and ق are preserved in the eastern variants of Persian (i.e. Dari and Tajiki), as well as in the southern dialects of the modern Iranian variety (e.g. Yazdi and Kermani dialects). Example: دقيقه [] ↔ [].
-e as the 3rd person singular suffix for verbs instead of Standard Persian -ad: می‌خوره ['mi:xoɾe] ↔ می‌خورد ['mi:xoɾæd] 
Use of verbal person suffixes on nominals for the verb بودن [bu:dæn]

Iranians can interchange colloquial Tehrani and standard Persian sociolects in conversational speech.

References

Sources 
 

Standard Persian
Persian dialects and varieties
Tehran
City colloquials